Zimmermann is a German occupational surname for a carpenter. The modern German terms for the occupation of carpenter are Zimmerer, Tischler, or Schreiner, but Zimmermann is still used.

Zimmer in German means room or archaically a chamber within a structure. The German man or mann (in English the extra n is ignored) is man or worker. The combination of the two means "a worker of wood", "room man" or room worker.

Zimmermann, as a surname is often confused with Zimmerman. The loss or addition of the double "n" may imply many things. This may include linguistic, racial, ethnic, religious or other cultural variations.

Many German names were often Anglicized or simplified by immigration officials upon entry into the United States. With Zimmermann the double 'n' Zimmermann was often seen as redundant in countries where English was spoken. As a part of routine, German names were often Anglicized or simplified later by immigrants to better fit in. Zimmerman became Carpenter for example. Sometimes this was done by immigration officials upon entry into the United States when the immigrant did not know how to spell their name and that variant became the legal name.

Notable people with the surname

Adolphus Zimmermann (1812–1891), American politician
Alain Zimmermann (born 1967), German businessman
Alexandra Zimmermann, British conservation scientist
Arthur Zimmermann (1864–1940), German Secretary of State for Foreign Affairs in 1917
Bodo Zimmermann (1886–1963), a German general during World War II
Dominikus Zimmermann (1685–1766), rococo architect
Eberhard August Wilhelm von Zimmermann (1743–1815), German geographer and zoologist
Elizabeth Zimmermann (1910–1999), British-born knitter and writer
Evan Zimmermann (born 1968), American businessman
Friedrich Zimmermann (1925–2012), German politician
Hubert Zimmermann (1941–2012), French Computer Networks scientist and entrepreneur
Jens Zimmermann (disambiguation)
Jérémie Zimmermann, (born 1978) co-founder of the Paris-based La Quadrature du Net
 Jeri Lynn Zimmermann (born 1968), better known as Jeri Ryan, actress
Johann Georg Ritter von Zimmermann (1728–1795), Swiss philosopher and physician 
Johann Jacob Zimmermann (1644–1693), German nonconformist
Joseph Zimmermann (engineer) (1912–2004), American inventor of the first successful answering machine 
Lydia Zimmermann (born 1966), Spanish filmmaker
Marie Zimmermann (1878–1972), American designer
Paul Zimmermann (1895–1980), German SS-Brigadeführer
Paul Zimmermann (blacksmith) (born 1939), German blacksmith who created contemporary forge work
Paul Zimmermann (born 1964), French computational mathematician
Philip R. Zimmermann (born 1954), creator of Pretty Good Privacy (PGP) e-mail encryption software
Pia Zimmermann (born 1956), German politician
Raquel Zimmermann (born 1983), Brazilian fashion model
Reinhard Zimmermann (born 1952), German jurist
Reinhard Sebastian Zimmermann (1815–1893), German artist
Sabine Zimmermann (TV host) (1951–2020), German TV host
Sabine Zimmermann (politician) (born 1960), German politician
Walter Max Zimmerman (1892–1980), German botanist
Warren Zimmermann (1934–2004), American ambassador
Wolfhart Zimmermann (1928–2016), German theoretical physicist

Composers
Anton Zimmermann (1741–1781), Austrian composer living and working in Bratislava
Bernd Alois Zimmermann (1918–1970), German composer of the opera Die Soldaten
Udo Zimmermann (1943–2021), German composer from Dresden, not related
Walter Zimmermann (born 1949), German composer from Schwabach, not related

Musicians
Dan Zimmermann (born 1966), German drummer for power metal band Gamma Ray
Ethel Agnes Zimmermann, birth name of Ethel Merman (1908–1984), American singer and actress
Frank Peter Zimmermann (born 1965), German violinist
Josef Zimmermann,
 German Cologne Cathedral organist
 German weight lifter
Margarita Zimmermann (born 1942), Argentinian mezzo-soprano
Robert Allen Zimmerman (born 1941), American musician, best known as Bob Dylan
Tabea Zimmermann (born 1966), German violist

Sportspeople
 Andréa Zimmermann (born 1976), Swiss ski mountaineer
 Andreas Zimmermann (born 1969), German footballer
 Bruce Zimmermann (born 1995), American baseball player
 Christian Zimmermann (born 1961), German-Palestinian dressage rider
 Christoph Zimmermann (born 1993), German footballer
 Cyril Zimmermann (born 1976), Swiss football referee
 Egon Zimmermann, (1939–2020) 1964 Olympic alpine skier from Austria
 Egon Zimmermann I (born 1933), 1960 Olympic alpine skier from Austria and who married Penny Pitou
 Felicia Zimmermann (born 1975), American Olympic fencer
 Georg Zimmermann (born 1997), German cyclist
 Herbert Zimmermann (football commentator) (1917–1966), German football commentator and Knight's Cross of the Iron Cross recipient
 Herbert Zimmermann (footballer) (born 1954), German football player
 Iris Zimmermann (born 1981), American Olympic fencer
 Jordan Zimmermann (born 1986), Major League Baseball pitcher
 Pierre Zimmermann (bridge) (born 1955), Monegasque bridge player

References

Occupational surnames
German-language surnames